August Bertrand Clifton (born 26 August 1881) was a Norwegian shipmaster and politician.

He was born in Tønsberg to ship owner Hans Bruu Johannessen and Sofie Kathrine Nielsen. He was elected representative to the Storting for the period 1925–1927, for the Conservative Party.

Second World War
During the Second World War, Clifton was captain on MT Fenris. The ship was torpedoed and damaged by the German submarine U-168 in February 1944, while in the Indian Ocean.

References

1881 births
Year of death missing
Politicians from Tønsberg
Conservative Party (Norway) politicians
Members of the Storting
Norwegian sailors
Norwegian people of World War II